M271 may refer to:

M271 motorway, a short motorway in Hampshire, England
Mercedes-Benz M271 engine, an automobile engine
M271 trailer, a US Army cargo trailer